Mahapurush O Kapurush is a 2013 Indian Bengali language comedy drama film directed by Aniket Chattopadhyay.

Plot
Bireshwar Chatterjee (Dipankar De), a wealthy industrialist, is a very happy man. The reason for his happiness is that Shri Shri Sadgajananda Maharaj (Bratya Basu), a holy man with powers that control even the Andromeda Galaxy (boasted by Sadgajananda himself), is residing at his house. Naturally, many people from the upper strata of the society (the mayor, a tollywood actress, a writer, etc.) is coming to pay homage to the saint. Unknown to everyone, Sadgajananda is actually a con man, Gopal, who makes a living conning people, along with his partner, Aapu (Lama). 
In a parallel story, a thief (also Bratya Basu) breaks into a house of a family of four people, where he is accidentally killed. The family members decide to dispose of the dead body in some remote area but are constantly harassed by the police inspector (Biswanath Basu). By a series of events, the dead body lands up in Bireshwar's mansion, where meanwhile, Sadgajananda and his partner had fled with valuables, leaving Bireshwar's prestige in jeopardy.

Cast 
 Bratya Basu
 Lama Halder
 Dipankar De 
 Locket Chatterjee 
 Tanuka Chatterjee 
 Bhola Tamang
 Ritwick Chakraborty
 Rimjhim Mitra
 Sujoy Prosad Chatterjee
 Biswanath Basu
 Koneenica Banerjee
 Kanchana Maitra
 Badshah Moitra (cameo)
 Supriyo Datta

See also 
 Bye Bye Bangkok, a 2011 Bengali-language films

External links

References 

Bengali-language Indian films
2010s Bengali-language films
2013 films
Films scored by Savvy Gupta
Films directed by Aniket Chattopadhyay